"Can't You See" is a song written by Toy Caldwell of The Marshall Tucker Band. The song was originally recorded by the band on their 1973 debut album, The Marshall Tucker Band, and released as the album's first single. It was re-released in 1977 and peaked at number 75 on the Billboard Hot 100. Cover versions of  "Can't You See" have charted for Waylon Jennings (in 1976) and the Zac Brown Band with Kid Rock (2010).

A live version, recorded live at the Performing Arts Center in Milwaukee, Wisconsin on July 31, 1974, is included as the final track on the band's 1975 album, Searchin' for a Rainbow.  Cash Box said of it that it showcased "their distinctive guitar and flute sounds."

The original recording is noted for its flute introduction and ending, both by Jerry Eubanks.

Artistry

The song, musically, is a cross between country rock and Southern rock.

The lyrics are noted as being dark, reflecting heartache and "a man running as far away as he can to begin the process of healing himself".

Cover versions

Waylon Jennings 

"Can't You See" was covered by American country music artist Hank Williams Jr. for his 1975 album Hank Williams Jr. and Friends and also by Waylon Jennings for his 1976 album Are You Ready for the Country. Jennings' version was released as the album's first single in July 1976 and peaked at number 4 on the Billboard Hot Country Singles chart. It also reached number 1 on the RPM Country Tracks chart in Canada.

Other versions
Matt Minglewood's The Minglewood Band recorded a version on 1979's Minglewood Band album. It is a staple in his live shows to this day, and includes a preamble about the song being about loneliness, painting a picture of a man leaving the rural East Coast of Canada for the Big City and how when his love leaves he's lonely.
Halfway to Gone covered the song on their 2002 album Second Season.
Black Stone Cherry covered the song on their 2011 album Between the Devil & the Deep Blue Sea.

Chart performance

The Marshall Tucker Band

Waylon Jennings

Zac Brown Band with Kid Rock

References

1976 singles
1977 singles
1973 songs
Waylon Jennings songs
The Marshall Tucker Band songs
Zac Brown Band songs
Kid Rock songs
Capricorn Records singles
RCA Records Nashville singles
Rock ballads
Country ballads